Buinak (also Romanized as Bū’īnak and Būynak) is a village in Ilat-e Qaqazan-e Sharqi Rural District, Kuhin District, Qazvin County, Qazvin Province, Iran. At the 2006 census, its population was 844, in 199 families.

References 

Populated places in Qazvin County